Bizorędki  is a village in the administrative district of Gmina Sobków, within Jędrzejów County, Świętokrzyskie Voivodeship, in south-central Poland.
Adjacents with Bizoręda.

History 
In 1827 y. was 12 houses and 60 villagers.

References 

Villages in Jędrzejów County